Shanghai Film Critics Awards are given annually to honor excellence in national cinema by an organization of film reviewers from Shanghai Film Critics Association and Shanghai Film Museum. This event is the only critics' awards in mainland China. The first annual held in 1991. From 1991 to 1993, they only selected 10 film awarded Film of Merit. Since 1994, adding categories, including Best Director, Best Actor and Best Actress.

No award was given out for the year 2015. As of 2016, only newcomer categories were awarded.

Awards
Best Director
Best Actor
Best Actress
Film of Merit
Best New Director 
Best New Actor 
Best New Actress

References

External links
IMDb
Hudong Wiki

Chinese film awards
Awards established in 1991
1991 establishments in China
Critic awards
Annual events in China
Recurring events established in 1991
Culture in Shanghai